Year 912 (CMXII) was a leap year starting on Wednesday (link will display the full calendar) of the Julian calendar.


Events

By place

Byzantine Empire 
 May 11 – Emperor Leo VI (the Wise) dies after a 26-year reign in which he has completed the Byzantine code of laws (Basilika). He is succeeded by his brother Alexander III as emperor (basileus) alongside Leo's 6-year-old son Constantine VII. Alexander becomes de facto ruler of the Byzantine Empire and expels Empress Zoe Karbonopsina, the mother of Constantine, from the palace and exiles her to a nunnery.

Europe 
 German dukes Henry the Fowler of Saxony and Arnulf I (the Bad) of Bavaria claim themselves to be sovereign princes, not recognizing the authority of their overlord, King Conrad I of the East Frankish Kingdom, as he is not a Carolingian. Duke Erchanger II of Swabia and Conrad's brother, Duke Eberhard III of Franconia, support the Conradines.
 Orso II Participazio becomes the doge of Venice. He sends his son Pietro to Constantinople in order to re-establish the relationship with Alexander III.
 King Ordoño II of Galicia continues his expansion of the Christian polity. He sacks the cities of Mérida and Évora.

Britain 
 Lady Æthelflæd expands her policy by building defensive burghs at Shrewsbury and Bridgnorth. The fortifications are needed to protect Mercia against plundering Vikings from the Danelaw (Danish territory in England).

Arabian Empire 
 October 16 – Abd al-Rahman III succeeds his grandfather Abdullah ibn Muhammad (after his execution) and becomes emir of Córdoba (Al-Andalus).
 The second rebellion in two years, of the Kutama tribesmen against the Fatimid Caliphate, occurs.

China 
 July 18 – Emperor Taizu (Zhu Wen) is murdered in the imperial palace at Kaifeng by his eldest living son Zhu Yougui after a 5-year reign. He succeeds his father as the ruler of Later Liang.

By topic

Religion 
 Euthymius I is deposed as Patriarch of Constantinople, and Nicholas Mystikos is restored.

Births 
 November 23 – Otto I, emperor of the Holy Roman Empire (d. 973)
 Alberic II, princeps and duke of Spoleto (d. 954)
 Frederick I, duke of Upper Lorraine (approximate date)
 Hyejong, king of Goryeo (Korea) (d. 945)
 Ma Xichong, governor and ruler of Chu (d. 951)
 Minamoto no Mitsunaka, Japanese nobleman and samurai (d. 997)
 Nakatsukasa, Japanese waka poet (d. 991)
 Nikephoros II, emperor of the Byzantine Empire (d. 969)
 Pelagius of Córdoba, Christian martyr (d. 926)
 Ryōgen, Japanese monk and abbot (d. 985)
 Willa of Tuscany, queen consort of Italy (or 911)
 Xue Juzheng, Chinese scholar-official and historian (d. 981)

Deaths 
 May 11 – Leo VI, emperor of the Byzantine Empire (b. 866)
 May 25 – Xue Yiju, chancellor of Later Liang 
 July 18 – Zhu Wen, emperor of Later Liang (b. 852)
 August 15 – Han Jian, Chinese warlord (b. 855)
 October 15 – Abdullah ibn Muhammad, Muslim emir (b. 844)
 October 25 – Rudolph I, king of Burgundy (b. 859)
 November 30 – Otto I, duke of Saxony 
 Ahmad ibn Yusuf, Muslim mathematician (b. 835)
 Guanxiu, Chinese Buddhist monk and poet (b. 832)
 Hermenegildo Gutiérrez, Galician nobleman
 Hyogong, king of Silla (Korea) (b. 883)
 Ibn Khordadbeh, Persian geographer
 Notker the Stammerer, Benedictine monk
 Oleg of Novgorod, Varangian prince
 Pietro Tribuno, doge of Venice (approximate date)
 Qusta ibn Luqa, Syrian Melkite physician (b. 820)
 Rudalt, Breton nobleman (approximate date)
 Smbat I, king of Armenia (approximate date)
 Wilferth, bishop of Lichfield (approximate date)
 Zhang Ce, chancellor of Later Liang 
 Zhu Youwen, prince of Later Liang

References